Pope Zephyrinus was the bishop of Rome from 199 to his death on 20 December 217. He was born in Rome, and succeeded Victor I. Upon his death on 20 December 217, he was succeeded by his principal advisor, Callixtus I. He is known for combating heresies and defending the divinity of Christ.

Papacy
During the 18-year pontificate of Zephyrinus, the young Church endured persecution under the Emperor Septimius Severus until his death in the year 211. To quote Alban Butler, "this holy pastor was the support and comfort of the distressed flock". According to St. Optatus, Zephyrinus also combated new heresies and apostasies, chief of which were Marcion, Praxeas, Valentine and the Montanists. Eusebius  insists that Zephyrinus fought vigorously against the blasphemies of the two Theodotuses, who in response treated him with contempt, but later called him the greatest defender of the divinity of Christ. Although he was not physically martyred for the faith, his suffering – both mental and spiritual – during his pontificate have earned him the title of martyr, a title that was repealed 132 years after his death. He was accused of being seduced by Monarchian views.

Conflicts
During the reign of Emperor Septimius Severus (193–211), relations with the young Christian Church deteriorated, and in 202 or 203, the edict of persecution appeared, which forbade conversion to Christianity under the severest penalties.

Zephyrinus's predecessor, Pope Victor I, had excommunicated Theodotus the Tanner for reviving a heresy that Christ only became God after His Resurrection. Theodotus' followers formed a separate heretical community at Rome, ruled by another Theodotus, the Money Changer, and Asclepiodotus. Natalius, tortured for his faith during the persecution, was persuaded by Asclepiodotus to become a bishop in their sect in exchange for a monthly stipend of 150 denarii. Natalius then reportedly experienced several visions warning him to abandon these heretics. According to an anonymous work entitled The Little Labyrinth quoted by Eusebius, Natalius was whipped a whole night by an angel; the next day, he donned sackcloth and ashes and weeping bitterly threw himself at the feet of Zephyrinus.

Feast day
A feast of St Zephyrinus, Pope and Martyr, held on 26 August, was inserted in the General Roman Calendar in the 13th century, but was removed in the 1969 revision, since he was not a martyr and 26 August is not the anniversary of his death which is 20 December, the day under which he is now mentioned in the Roman Martyrology. His feast is currently celebrated on 26 August in both the Extraordinary Form of the Roman Rite and within the Maronite Catholic Church.

See also

Illiterate popes
List of Catholic saints
List of popes

Notes

References
Rendina, Claudio, The Popes' Histories and Secrets (2002)

External links

 

2nd-century births
217 deaths
2nd-century archbishops
2nd-century Romans
3rd-century archbishops
3rd-century Christian saints
3rd-century Romans
Ancient Christians involved in controversies
Italian popes
Italian saints
Papal saints
Clergy from Rome
Popes
Year of birth unknown
2nd-century popes
3rd-century popes